Brogren is a surname. Notable people with the surname include: 

Lena Brogren (1929–2005), Swedish actress
Per-Olof Brogren (born 1939), Swedish speed skater
Stefan Brogren (born 1972), Canadian actor, director, and producer

See also
Brogden (disambiguation)